Frank Stone  (22 August 1800 – 18 November 1859) was an English painter. He was born in Manchester, and was entirely self-taught.

Career
He was elected an Associate of the Society of Painters in Water Colours in 1833 and Member in 1843; and an Associate of the Royal Academy in 1851.

The works he first exhibited at the Academy were portraits, but from 1840 onwards he contributed figure pictures, scenes from Shakespeare, scripture and sentimental subjects, many of which were engraved.

In 1850 he led the opposition within the Academy to the innovations of the Pre-Raphaelite Brotherhood, having already criticised their work in the previous year. When Dante Gabriel Rossetti wrote a very critical review of Stone's work in return, Stone launched an outright assault on Pre-Raphaelitism, initiating the controversy that engulfed the movement. Leading Pre-Raphaelite William Holman Hunt later depicted a print of one of Stone's works in the background of his painting The Awakening Conscience. It has been suggested that this was intended as an insult, since the furniture of the room was supposed to represent the bad taste of the characters depicted.

According to William Powell Frith, Stone was a loyal friend, but very argumentative, "No fair-weather friend was he, but true as steel when friendly countenance might be sorely needed. Still, I confess there were drawbacks to the enjoyment of Stone's society. It was enough for anyone to advance an opinion for Stone to differ from it."

He was the father of the painter Marcus Stone who illustrated many works by Charles Dickens (the Stones were Dickens' neighbours for many years) and himself produced a frontispiece for an edition of Martin Chuzzlewit. He also had a daughter, Ellen Stone.

Stone died on 18 November 1859, and was buried six days later on the western side of Highgate Cemetery. The inscription on his grave (plot no.9947) has largely worn away.

Gallery

References

External links

 
Illustrated list of portraits by Frank Stone at the National Portrait Gallery
 Profile on Royal Academy of Arts Collections
 Engraving by John Henry Robinson of a painting 'Donna Julia' with a poetical illustration by Letitia Elizabeth Landon  in Heath’s Book of Beauty, 1833.
 Engraving by H. Cook of a painting  with a poetical illustration by Letitia Elizabeth Landon in Heath’s Book of Beauty, 1833.
 Engraving by James Thomson of a painting  with a poetical illustration by Letitia Elizabeth Landon in Heath’s Book of Beauty, 1833.
 Engraving by William Greatbach of a painting  in The Amulet, 1836 with a poetical illustration by Letitia Elizabeth Landon.
 A poetical illustration by Letitia Elizabeth Landon to the painting  in Forget Me Not, 1836.
 An engraving by C E Wagstaff in Fisher's Drawing Room Scrap Book, 1836 of the painting  with a poetical illustration by Letitia Elizabeth Landon.

1800 births
1859 deaths
19th-century English painters
English male painters
Artists from Manchester
Associates of the Royal Academy
Burials at Highgate Cemetery
19th-century English male artists